Mark Williams may refer to:

Entertainment
 Mark Williams (writer) (born 1951), academic, writer, critic, poet
 Mark Williams (singer) (born 1954), New Zealand singer
 Mark Williams (album)
 Mark Williams (actor) (born 1959), British actor and comedian
 Mark Williams (organist) (born 1978), Informator Choristarum at Magdalen College, Oxford
 Mark Williams (radio host), American journalist and radio personality
 Mark "Slave" Williams, hip hop MC, television presenter
 Mark Williams (game designer), original artist at Hero Games
 Mark Williams (Holby City), fictional character in Holby City
 Mark Williams (filmmaker), American producer, director and writer

Sports

Football
 Mark Williams (Australian footballer, born 1957), with North Melbourne and Footscray
 Mark Williams (Australian footballer, born 1958), with Port Adelaide, Brisbane, Collingwood, former coach of Port Adelaide
 Mark Williams (Australian footballer, born 1964), with Carlton and Footscray, former coach of Sandringham
 Mark Williams (Australian footballer, born 1983), with Hawthorn and Essendon
 Mark Williams (South African footballer) (born 1966), former South African international footballer
 Mark Williams (American football) (born 1971), American football player
 Mark Williams (footballer, born 1970), Northern Ireland international footballer
 Mark Williams (footballer, born 1978), English footballer for Rochdale and Rotherham United
 Mark Williams (footballer, born 1981), English footballer who played as a midfielder
 Mark Williams (Scottish footballer) (born 1995), Scottish footballer

Other sports
 Mark Williams (baseball) (born 1953), American former Major League Baseball player
 Mark Williams (cricketer, born 1955), English cricketer
 Mark Williams (rugby union) (born 1961), rugby player for the U.S. national rugby team
 Mark Williams (snooker player) (born 1975), Welsh professional snooker player
 Mark Williams (volleyball) (born 1979), Australian volleyball player
 Mark Williams (bowls), Welsh former world bowls champion
 Mark Williams (basketball) (born 2001), American basketball player

Other
 Mark Williams (Colorado politician) (born 1962)
 Mark Williams (politician) (born 1966), British Member of Parliament and Welsh Liberal Democrat leader
 Mark W. Williams (1925–2013), US Army Ranger and participant in D-Day
 Mark London Williams (born 1959), American author and journalist
 Mark T. Williams (born 1963), educator, author and risk management expert
 J. Mark G. Williams, academic and author specializing in depression and suicide

See also
Mark Williams Company, a small software company that created Coherent
Marc Williams (born 1988), Welsh footballer
Marcus Williams (disambiguation)

Williams, Mark